Ingrid Ebouka-Babackas is a Congolese politician. She is Minister of Planning, Statistics and Regional Integration since May 7, 2016.
She was previously Director General of National Financial Institutions at the Ministry of Economy, Finance, Budget and Public Portfolio.

Early life and education 
Born Ingrid Olga Ghislaine Ebouka-Babackas, she is the daughter of the former Minister of Finance Édouard Ebouka-Babackas. After studying finance in Paris (France), she returned to the Congo.

Career 
After her return, Ebouka-Babackas worked in several financial institutions, including the International Bank of Congo and the Central African Banking Commission (2001-2011). She was subsequently a member of the National Credit Council, the National Monetary and Financial Committee and the Central African Financial Stability Committee. 

Later, Ebouka-Babackas was appointed Director General of National Financial Institutions at the Ministry of Economy, Finance, Budget and Public Portfolio. On the occasion of the 2016 presidential election, she was part of Denis Sassou-Nguesso's National CampaigAfter her return, Ebouka-Babackas worked in several financial institutions, including the International Bank of Congo and the Central African Banking Commission (2001-2011). She is subsequently a member of the National Credit Council, the National Monetary and Financial Committee and the Central African Financial Stability Committee. After her return, Ebouka-Babackas worked in several financial institutions, including the International Bank of Congo and the Central African Banking Commission (2001-2011). She is subsequently a member of the National Credit Council, the National Monetary and Financial Committee and the Central African Financial Stability Committee. Later, she was appointed Director General of National Financial Institutions at the Ministry of Economy, Finance, Budget and Public Portfolio. On the occasion of the 2016 presidential election, she was part of Denis Sassou-Nguesso's National CampaigAfter her return, Ebouka-Babackas worked in several financial institutions, including the International Bank of Congo and the Central African Banking Commission (2001-2011). She is subsequently a member of the National Credit Council, the National Monetary and Financial Committee and the [[Central African Financial Stability Commi

Other activities 
 Joint World Bank-IMF Development Committee, Member (since 2022)
 African Development Bank (AfDB), Ex-Officio Member of the Board of Governors (since 2016)
 Multilateral Investment Guarantee Agency (MIGA), World Bank Group, Ex-Officio Member of the Board of Governors (since 2016)
 World Bank, Ex-Officio Member of the Board of Governors (since 2016)

References 

Year of birth missing (living people)
Living people
Government ministers of the Republic of the Congo
Women government ministers of the Republic of the Congo
21st-century Republic of the Congo women politicians
21st-century Republic of the Congo politicians